The IFA Interim Intermediate League was a temporary league in Northern Ireland for one season only (2008–09), consisting of the former members of the IFA Intermediate League (dissolved in 2008) who did not meet the criteria for the new IFA Championship. Members of the Interim League had one year to make improvements in order to gain entry to the 2009–10 IFA Championship.

The title was won by Harland & Wolff Welders.

With the Championship expanding to two divisions the following season; Championship 1 and Championship 2, ten of the twelve members of the league succeeded in gaining entry to the 2009–10 IFA Championship 2, with only Oxford United Stars and Brantwood failing to do so, dropping out of national football.

League table

IFA Interim Intermediate League Cup
A knock-out competition for members of the Interim League - the IFA Interim Intermediate League Cup - took place during 2008-09 and was won by Harland & Wolff Welders, who beat Dundela in the final on 9 December 2008.

See also

IFA Premiership
IFA Championship
IFA Intermediate Cup
Irish Cup
Irish League Cup
County Antrim Shield
Steel & Sons Cup
Mid-Ulster Cup
Bob Radcliffe Cup
North West Senior Cup
Craig Memorial Cup
Northern Ireland football league system

References 

Association football leagues in Northern Ireland
Defunct football competitions in Northern Ireland
3
North